Alvan Clark (March 8, 1804 – August 19, 1887), born in Ashfield, Massachusetts, was an American astronomer and telescope maker. He was the descendant of a Cape Cod whaling family of English ancestry.

Biography
He started as a portrait painter and engraver (c.1830s–1850s), and at the age of 40 became involved in telescope making. Using glass blanks made by Chance Brothers of Birmingham, England, and Feil-Mantois of Paris, France, his firm Alvan Clark & Sons ground lenses for refracting telescopes.

Although not specifically searching for double stars, he did make a number of discoveries while testing his completed telescope objectives, including Mu Herculis, 8 Sextantis, and 95 Ceti. One of Clark's sons, Alvan Graham Clark, discovered the dim companion of Sirius. Two craters bear Clark Sr.'s name. The crater Clark on the Moon is jointly named for him and his son, Alvan Graham Clark, and one on Mars is named in his honour. His other son was George Bassett Clark; both sons were partners in the firm.

Clark was also competitive in target shooting and received a patent for his device to allow bullets to be seated into a muzzle-loading rifle without damage to either the bullet or the rifle's muzzle. Exclusive license to this patent (1,565 of April 24, 1840) was made to Edwin Wesson, brother of Daniel B. Wesson.

In 1880, Clark was elected as a member to the American Philosophical Society.

See also 
List of astronomical instrument makers
List of largest optical refracting telescopes

Image gallery
Portraits by Clark

References

Further reading
 "Recent Deaths. Alvan Clark." Boston Daily Evening Transcript, 19 August 1887.
 "Autobiography of Alvan Clark." New-England Historical and Genealogical Register 43 (January 1889): 52-58.
 
 Warner, Deborah Jean. Alvan Clark & Sons, Artists in Optics. Washington, 1968.

External links

 National Gallery of Art has works by Clark
 

1804 births
1887 deaths
American astronomers
Telescope manufacturers
Burials at Mount Auburn Cemetery
People from Ashfield, Massachusetts
Recipients of the Lalande Prize